Fudbalski klub BSK Borča is a Serbian football club from Borča, City of Belgrade. It is the football club of the Sports Society BSK Borča, BSK stands for Borčanski sportski klub meaning "Sports Society of Borča".

History
BSK Borča football club was founded in April, 1937, and played its first official match on May 6, that same year, against Bačko Petrovo Selo, a 4–2 win. It ceased its activities during the Second World War and was reestablished in 1947. For a short period it changed its name to Hajduk and ceased its activities in 1951.  Two years later, in 1953, it is reestablished as BSK and has been competing ever since.

The club's worst seasons since its founding were between 1990 and 1992, when it dropped from the Belgrade Zone League to First Division Belgrade, and lastly to the Second Division Belgrade, the lowest category of the competition.

The arrival of new leadership in the mid-1990s and, as of 2003, the new investments into the club have significantly contributed to the club's expansion into a major sports organization. The club's ascent started in 1993, with the arrival of Dragomir Vasić, the owner of Bami company. He stabilized the club financially and had the club's stadium capacity extended to additional 1.000 seats. The club has gradually started moving up, from First Division Belgrade to Belgrade Zone League and next to Serbian League North before being promoted to the Second League of FR Yugoslavia in 1998.  They played in the second national level until 2002, when, due to the league reorganisation, they ceded their place to OFK Vrbas and BSK was relegated to the Serbian League Belgrade where they played until 2006.

They were promoted to the Serbian First League in 2006, and immediately in their first two seasons, 2006–07 and 2007–08, the club headed into play-offs for the Serbian SuperLiga.  After failing in those two occasions, it will be in their third attempt, after finishing first in the 2008–09 season that they won promotion to the Serbian SuperLiga.  As the club stadium did not fulfill the criteriums for playing in the SuperLiga, BSK played their first two seasons in the higher tier on OFK Beograd home ground, the Omladinski stadion.  In their first season in SuperLiga, BSK finished 12th.

Stadium

Home field of BSK Borča is Vizelj park with 2.500 seats, and it was first inaugurated in 1958. There is a project under way which started in April 2009 and that will expand the stadium capacity to 8,000 seats, divided in four stands.

The club has a sports complex which includes 4 grass fields (the main one plus 3 auxiliary ones), a sports hall, and a restaurant with 300 seats and 16 luxury rooms. The club's reorganization and new infrastructure were possible thanks to the efforts of Obrad Ćesarević and Dragomir Vasić, who both try to keep the club and its professional team in fine standing.

Supporters
The supporters of BSK Borča are known as Borča Company (Serbian: Компанија Борча/Kompanija Borča). They were formed by fusion of few smaller groups – Beton Boys, Olosh Boys, LDK C-2 and Shakal Squad.

Honours and achievements
 Serbian First League
 Winners (1): 2008–09
Serbian League Belgrade
 Winners (1): 2005–06

Current squad

Out on loan

Technical staff

Notable former players
To appear in this section a player must have either:
 Played at least 80 games for the club.
 Set a club record or won an individual award while at the club.
 Played at least one international match for their national team at any time.
 Nebojša Pejić
 Borislav Topić
 Aleksandar Đukić
 Zoran Knežević
 Predrag Lazić
 Novak Martinović
 Vladimir Matić
 Perica Stančeski
 Asmir Kajević
 Šaleta Kordić
 Mitar Novaković
 Stefan Savić
 Vladimir Volkov
For the list of all former and current players with Wikipedia article, please see: :Category:FK BSK Borča players.

Managers
 Zoran Milinković (2005 – June 2008)
 Veličko Kaplanović (July 2008 – June 2009)
 Šefki Arifovski (July 2009 – April 2010)
 Miodrag Radanović (April 2010 – 2010)
 Srđan Vasiljević (June 2010 – September 2010)
 Milenko Kiković (September 2010 – June 2011)
 Naci Şensoy (July 2011 – August 2011)
 Saša Milanović (August 2011 – January 2012)
 Veličko Kaplanović (January 2012 – June 2012)
 Goran Milojević (July 2012 – January 2013)
 Nebojša Milošević (January 2013 – May 2013)

Kit manufacturers and shirt sponsors

References

External links
 

 
Association football clubs established in 1937
1937 establishments in Serbia
Football clubs in Belgrade
Palilula, Belgrade